Coleophora koreana is a moth of the family Coleophoridae. It is found in Korea.

The wingspan is about 11 mm.

References

koreana
Moths of Korea
Moths described in 1989